The LNB Pro A Best Defender Award is an annual professional basketball award that is given by the top tier division in France, the LNB Pro A. It is awarded to the most valuable defensive player in each Pro A regular season.

Winners

Awards by players

Notes 

LNB Pro A awards
European basketball awards
1980s establishments in France
Awards established in the 1980s